A green room is an off-stage space or facility for accommodating people making public appearances.

Green room may also refer to:

Venues
 Green Room (White House), a state parlor in the White House, home of the president of the United States
 Green Room Club, a London-based club

Entertainment
The Green Room (film), a 1978 French film
Green Room Awards, arts awards in Melbourne
The Green Room with Paul Provenza, a talk show on Showtime
Green Room (film), a 2015 American horror thriller film
Julie's Greenroom, a 2017 Netflix series starring Julie Andrews
Green Room Magazine, a theatrical weekly produced by Hugh D. McIntosh
Inside the Green Room, a podcast hosted by basketball player Danny Green

Music
 The Green Room (recording studio), a recording studio in Huntington Beach, California
 The Green Room (DJ Shaky Bonez album)
 The Green Room (Vivian Green album)
 The 97X Green Room, an annual series of compilation albums of live music recorded for WSUN-FM's Green Room series
 The Nokia Green Room, a television show that aired on the Channel 4 in the United Kingdom

See also
Green chamber (disambiguation)
Green Hall